Kisser is a German surname. Notable people with the surname include:

 Andreas Kisser (born 1968), Brazilian guitar player, songwriter, and producer

See also
 Isser (name)
 Kiser

German-language surnames